"Try Again" is a song recorded by American singer Aaliyah for the soundtrack to the 2000 film Romeo Must Die. It was written by Static Major and Timbaland, and produced by the latter. The song features an intro in which Timbaland pays homage to Eric B. & Rakim by rapping the duo's opening verse from "I Know You Got Soul". "Try Again" was released as the lead single from Romeo Must Die on March 21, 2000, by Blackground Records and Virgin Records. It was later included as a bonus track on international editions of Aaliyah's eponymous third and final studio album (2001).

"Try Again" was met with positive reviews from music critics and enjoyed commercial success. In the United States, it peaked atop the Billboard Hot 100, becoming the first single to reach number one based solely on airplay. The song peaked within the top five in Belgium, Canada, Denmark, Germany, Iceland, the Netherlands, Norway, Portugal, and the United Kingdom. The accompanying music video for the song was directed by Wayne Isham and won two MTV Video Music Awards in 2000. "Try Again" was also nominated for Best Female R&B Vocal Performance at the 43rd Annual Grammy Awards (2001).

Writing and production
In 1999, Aaliyah landed her first movie role in Romeo Must Die (2000), a loose adaptation of William Shakespeare's Romeo and Juliet. Aaliyah starred opposite martial artist Jet Li, playing a couple who fall in love amid their warring families. It grossed US$18.6 million in its first weekend, reaching number two at the box office. In addition to acting, Aaliyah served as an executive producer of the film soundtrack, to which she contributed four songs, including "Try Again". Aaliyah revealed that the production team "actually talked about the soundtrack before we even shot the movie".

"Try Again" was recorded at Sound on Sound Studios in New York City and was originally written as an inspirational song. It was written by Stephen "Static Major" Garrett and Timothy "Timbaland" Mosley, and produced by the latter. According to engineer Jimmy Douglass, it was "written to inspire young people, but Barry [Hankerson] heard it and told them, 'It's got to be about love'." After all the changes were made to the song, the melody and hook remained the same but the lyrics became love-themed.

Music and lyrics

Musically, "Try Again" is an R&B, electro, and dance-pop song. James Poletti from Dotmusic, stated that the song's sound is associated with Detroit techno. Other genres that are utilized within the songs instrumental is Hip hop, early EDM of the 2000s, and Acid House. Production wise, it "skews more toward the fuzzy electronic sounds of the future than the thumping hip-hop beats of the past". The song features "disembodied backing vocals, electronically treated string and flute samples, speaker-rumbling bass, and the sort of grinding synthesiser riff more usually found on late-1980s acid-house records". It also incorporates, "programmed snares, kicks and shakers for drums and overlays a wide array of synth sounds, sitars, horns, guitars, and a snaky, distorted bass line underneath it all". The "horn blasts straight out of a Renaissance processional and then it thrusts you onto a ripping electro-bass roller coaster with Aaliyah's airy voice serving as the wind blowing through your hair". Throughout the record, "Aaliyah's voice is as nimble as ever, slinkily sliding over the synth line and icing the techno-inspired beat with her R&B finesse". "As the song nears the end, a haunting growling noise stalks the edges of the mix like a monster on the prowl". According to Musicnotes, the song is composed in the key of C minor and is set in time signature of common time with a tempo of 92 beats per minute, while Aaliyah's vocal range spans from G3 to G4.

Lyrically, Aaliyah encourages "a potential partner not to give up on her". During the song's intro, Timbaland pays homage to Eric B. & Rakim by interpolating the duo's opening verse from "I Know You Got Soul". The chorus line "If at first you don't succeed, then dust yourself off and try again" is hypnotically repeated in a fashion similar to the sampling and vocal manipulation found in house music.

Release and promotion
On February 18, 2000, it was announced that "Try Again" would be released as the lead single from the Romeo Must Die: The Album soundtrack, while an accompanying music video would be directed by Wayne Isham. Blackground Records and Virgin Records officially serviced it to rhythmic contemporary radio in the United States on March 21, and to contemporary hit radio on April 4. On May 22, a maxi CD single was issued in Europe. In the United Kingdom, the single was released on July 10, 2000, via three formats: a CD single, a cassette single, and a 12-inch vinyl single.

In August 2021, it was reported that Aaliyah's recorded work for Blackground (since rebranded as Blackground Records 2.0) would be re-released on physical, digital, and, for the first time ever, streaming services in a deal between the label and Empire Distribution. Romeo Must Die was re-released on September 3, 2021, including "Try Again".

Live performances
To promote "Try Again" and Romeo Must Die, Aaliyah performed the song during numerous televised appearances. It was first performed alongside "Come Back in One Piece" on Romeo Must Die: The Kickoff Special, which aired on MTV in March 2000. Aaliyah performed it again on The Rosie O'Donnell Show on April 17. On April 26, she performed the song on both Total Request Live and The Tonight Show with Jay Leno. To promote "Try Again" in the United Kingdom, Aaliyah performed it via satellite on the July 21, 2000 episode of Top of the Pops.

Critical reception
 Taylor from Billboard felt that Aaliyah had another smash hit on her hands and praised her vocal styling by saying: "Aaliyah's sultry vocals slide all over the futuristic beat". However, he had a mixed response to the production; although he thought the synth sample and snare alternate lived up to his expectations, he ultimately felt that the synth sample "becomes grating as the song progresses." James Poletti from Dotmusic praised the song and felt that the chorus "refuses to leave your brain after a couple of listens". Ultimately he declared that "Try Again" was a "class Timbaland product" and that the song would be equally successful in Europe.

Accolades

Commercial performance
"Try Again" debuted on the US Billboard Hot 100 the week of March 18, 2000, at number 58. During the week of June 17 the song jumped 6-1, becoming the first song ever to peak atop the chart based solely on airplay, as it was not commercially released in the United States. At the time of "Try Again" reaching the top spot it gained 5.5 million listeners, in total reaching 92 million audience impressions. The song also peaked at number one on Hot 100 Airplay, number three on Mainstream Top 40, and number four on Hot R&B/Hip-Hop Songs. On the year-end Billboard Hot 100 chart for 2000, the song placed 12th. It placed 98th on the 2000s decade-end Billboard Hot 100.

In the United Kingdom, "Try Again" debuted and peaked at number five on the UK Singles Chart on July 16, 2000―for the week ending July 22, 2000―while staying within the top 75 for twelve weeks. The song has sold over 209,000 copies and remains Aaliyah's best-selling single in the country. "Try Again" also achieved commercial success elsewhere in Europe, peaking within the top five in Belgium, Germany, Iceland, the Netherlands, Norway, and Portugal. In Australia, the song reached number eight on the ARIA Singles Chart. It became the country's 51st best-selling single of 2000.

Music video

Synopsis and fashion
The accompanying music video for "Try Again" was directed by Wayne Isham. It begins with Jet Li entering a hall of mirrors and Aaliyah stepping in, wearing a revealing low-cut bra and tight low-rise leather pants, Timbaland is also shown. The room is dim with a shallow pool and circle light in the center to resemble the moon shining over the ocean represented by said pool. In an interview with Nylon, Lee mentioned that he knew Try Again was going to be a dance video and that she was going to "wear one outfit for the entire thing". For the music video Aaliyah is wearing a crystal bra top with a matching choker by Dolce & Gabbana. According to her former stylist Derek Lee "the crystal bra top offered so little coverage that LeGrand had to add some extra rows of rhinestones so Aaliyah felt more comfortable". Prior to the video Lee had a working relationship with Dolce & Gabbana , and he seen an ad for the top, in Vogue "for something that was coming out for pre-order". After seeing that ad he knew that outfit would be the look for the video "Because if we needed to level up on her little bra tops with the baggy pants, maybe we should go this route". Dolce & Gabbana had multiple colors of the bra but Lee opted for the plain crystal because it had the matching belt and choker.

Reception
The music video for "Try Again" made its official television debut on MTV during the week of March 5, 2000. On the week of March 12, the video debuted on the cable network channel VH1. Meanwhile, during the week of March 19, the video debuted on The Box, while it debuted on BET on April 3. During its chart run, the video received heavy television airplay on multiple music video countdown shows. For the week ending May 8, the video was the most played video on BET. On MTV, the video was the third most-played video during the week ending May 22.

Legacy

"Try Again" became the first airplay track to reach No. 1 on The Billboard Hot 100 without the benefit of a retail single. Alexis Petridis from The Guardian felt that, "Try Again" was "one of the most remarkable and forward-thinking pop singles of 2000". According to Jonathan Keefe from Slant Magazine, the song "influenced hip-hop, dance, and pop over the nine years that followed". He also felt that "After "Try Again", much of the decade's rhythmic music rested on the shoulders of thin-voiced, icily detached singers like Rihanna, Alison Goldfrapp, Ciara, and Annie, none of whom have been able to match the presence or the lived-in soulfulness Aaliyah conveyed with her ethereal wisp of a voice".
George Michael sampled "Try Again" in his 2002 song "Freeek!". German NDH band Knorkator covered the song on their album Ich hasse Musik. In a 2013 episode of The Mindy Project, Dr. Danny (portrayed by Chris Messina) showed Mindy (portrayed by Mindy Kaling) the choreography from the song's music video. The song was featured in the coming-of-age drama film Boyhood (2014). Billboard ranked the song at number 225 on their Greatest of All Time Songs of the Summer chart. On August 21, 2019, the Madame Tussauds Las Vegas revealed a wax figure of Aaliyah. The life-sized figure was modelled on Aaliyah's appearance in the music video for "Try Again". It was unveiled by Aaliyah's brother Rashad Haughton to an invited audience.

Track listings

 US 7-inch jukebox vinyl
A. "Try Again" – 4:05
B. "Come Back in One Piece" (featuring DMX) – 4:18		

 US 12-inch vinyl single and UK CD single
 "Try Again" (album version) – 4:44
 "Try Again" (Timbaland remix) – 4:59
 "Try Again" (D'Jam Hassan remix) – 4:50
 "Try Again" (instrumental) – 4:38

 UK 12-inch vinyl single
A1. "Try Again" (Timbaland remix) – 4:59
A2. "Try Again" (D'Jam Hassan remix) – 4:50
B1. "Try Again" (album version) – 4:44
B2. "Try Again" (instrumental) – 4:38

 European CD single
 "Try Again" – 4:04
 "Try Again" (Timbaland remix) – 4:59

 French 12-inch vinyl single
A1. "Try Again" (radio edit) – 4:04
A2. "Try Again" (instrumental) – 4:43
B1. "Try Again" (Timbaland remix) – 4:59

 Australian CD single
 "Try Again" – 4:04
 "Try Again" (Timbaland remix) – 4:59
 "Try Again" (D'Jam Hassan remix) – 5:28
 "Try Again" (instrumental) – 4:43

Charts

Weekly charts

Year-end charts

Decade-end charts

Certifications

Release history

See also
 List of Billboard Hot 100 number-one singles of 2000
 List of Billboard Rhythmic number-one songs of the 2000s

References

Bibliography

External links
 
 Official website

2000 singles
Aaliyah songs
Billboard Hot 100 number-one singles
MTV Video Music Award for Best Female Video
Music videos directed by Wayne Isham
Song recordings produced by Timbaland
Songs written by Static Major
Songs written by Timbaland
Blackground Records singles
1999 songs
Songs written for films
Electro songs